Bogor Station (BOO), formerly Buitenzorg Station is a railway station located in the city of Bogor, West Java. This station serves as the terminus for the Red Line service of KRL Commuterline. The station has five island platforms and two side platforms. The station is located +246 meter above sea level.

This station is the terminal station for Commuterline trips that serve the Jabodetabek area. Completed in 1881, the station originally faced east. However, with the development of the increasingly crowded KRL Commuterline, the departure gate for Commuterline passengers was moved to the west. Since 17 December 2021, both doors are equally operated.

This station is busy with commuters from Bogor to Jakarta. Currently this station serves KRL Commuter Lin Bogor to and from Jakarta Kota.  Since 1 June 2022, the Pangrango train line, which previously only served shunting, now serves passengers regularly.

This station used to serve intercity trains. Nowadays, the intercity services have moved from this station to the nearby Bogor Paledang station.

History 

In the early 1870s, the Nederlandsch-Indische Spoorweg Maatschappij built a station at Buitenzorg (Bogor's previous name) as the last section of the Batavia–Buitenzorg railway linking Kleine Boom with Buitenzorg. The station opened for the first time to the public on 31 January 1873 and it was built in the style of Neoclassical architecture. No less than the first 40 years, this station was managed by NIS.

In 1881, Staatsspoorwegen (SS) built the second Buitenzorg Station as part of the construction of the Bogor–Bandung–Banjar–Kutoarjo–Yogyakarta railway line. The construction of this railroad line requires the role of the government considering the construction costs are more expensive than the construction of flat tracks. By appointing David Maarschalk as head of service, the first phase of the SS railway line was built, namely the construction of the southern Java line and the construction of the Surabaya-Pasuruan-Malang line. As of 5 October 1881, the first segment of the railroad line, Bogor–Cicurug, had been completed. As of 17 May 1884, the route had extended to Bandung.

In 1913, the Batavia–Buitenzorg railway line was purchased by the SS. In the past, a large field called Wilhelmina Park was once part of the Bogor station.

The station renovation was once carried out by the Ministry of Transportation in 2009. The station building which reads "1881", which faces Nyi Raja Permas street, was never used as the station entrance for the public with the station door being moved to face Mayor Oking street.

On 20 October 2016, KRL Commuterline unveiled a new 570 square meter hall built in front of the station. This expansion was built mainly to maximize the passenger flow and to separate both incoming and outgoing passengers.

After years of not being serviced, the old station building facing east was reopened on 17 December 2021. This east door faces Bogor City Square. The departure gate on the east side of the station is directly integrated with the square. To support the operations of the east gate, KAI Commuter has built a ticket box at the entrance, ten e-gates, and two vending machines in the hall of the station building.

Architecture 

This station is thick with European nuances; rich in geometric ornaments such as clouds, lion's legs, and niches influenced by the Classical Greek style with symmetrical and all-geometric elements. The style of the station building is Indische Empire with a touch of Neoclassical style main entrance and lobby.

In the VIP room stands a marble inscription as high as 1 meter. This monument is a symbol of congratulations from SS employees to David Maarschalk who is entering retirement for his efforts to develop railroads in Java. This inscription was made as a substitute for the statue of David Maarschalk which was previously in place of this inscription.

The gable shape and arched arch on the front façade give the building a graceful impression.  The walls are made of stucco bricks with striped strokes and a molding cornice framing the gable roof above. Windows and doors are made of wood with a strong size so as to give the building a classic impression.  The station platform is covered with an overcapping umbrella made of corrugated iron supported by a steel frame. The station has two floors connected by a winding staircase.

Currently, although the main station building has remained relatively unchanged, the overcapping of the station has undergone changes. The roof overpass of the station has now been partially hollowed out and cut, and the steel framework has also been partially cut above line 3 to accommodate the overhead power cables when the Batavia–Buitenzorg KRL was in operation. The KRL started operating in 1925 to commemorate the 50th anniversary of the SS.

Station layout 
The station has two adjoining buildings. The main building is the entrance area to the station, lobby, administration office, ticket sales, and other facilities. Meanwhile, the second building is an overcapping building that houses the platform and two railroad tracks.

This station has eight railway lines.  Line 3 is a straight line in the direction of Depok-Jakarta as well as a single-lane railway in the direction of Cianjur–Padalarang. Line 5 is a double track straight downstream direction (from Depok-Jakarta).

Services
The following is a list of train services at the Bogor Station.

Passenger services 
 KAI Commuter
  Bogor Line, to

Supporting transportation

Places of Interest
Bogor Botanical Gardens
Bogor Palace
Museum Nasional Sejarah Alam Indonesia (Indonesian Museum of Ethnobotany)
Museum Perjuangan Bogor (Bogor Perjuangan Museum)
Pembela Tanah Air Museum
Bogor Agricultural University Baranangsiang Campus
Jagorawi Toll Road Bogor Toll Gate

Incidents 

 On 30 August 2022, an angkot with route number 08 heading for Citeureup-Pasar Anyar, it was suspected that the brakes failed at the railroad crossing on Jalan Kebon Pedes in the Bogor–Cilebut compartment. The angkot was also hit by the KRL Commuterline heading for Jakarta Kota with train number KA 4073 and rolled over to the side of the rails. Luckily the driver managed to get out before the train hit the angkot. As a result, several KRL trips experienced diversions resulting in a buildup of passengers at Bogor Station and a number of other stations.

Gallery

References

External links
 

Bogor
Railway stations in West Java
Railway stations opened in 1881
1881 establishments in the Dutch Empire